Lakeside is a private community and census-designated place in Danbury Township, Ottawa County, Ohio, United States, on the shores of Lake Erie. It was formed in 1873 by members of the Methodist Church and remains a church-affiliated vacation resort and United Methodist Annual Conference site. It is one of only a few continuously operating Independent Chautauquas that persist in the 21st century. Located just west of the village of Marblehead, the community is approximately one square mile in size. The entire community is listed on the National Register of Historic Places as the Lakeside Historic District.

As an unincorporated community, Lakeside is governed by the Lakeside Association, a company whose CEO is the de facto leader of the community. Its current CEO is Kip Greenhill.

History
Lakeside was established under the jurisdiction of the Central Ohio Conference of the UMC in August 1873. It was first founded as a tented revivalist camp, where it served as a hub for Methodist teachings. Meanwhile, the Chautauqua movement began to gain popularity. Lakeside soon thereafter became a Chautauqua, allowing its popularity to pick up over time and gain popularity with other denominations. The first permanent building was erected somewhere near the Hoover Auditorium, with the first residential cottages being built at the shores of Lake Erie. Despite this increase in popularity and permanent habitation, the bulk of services had yet to be provided until 1875, when the first part of Hotel Lakeside was built.

Residential land and usage 
The first residential buildings were cottages, which were sold out on plots of land with renewable 99 year leases. Over the years, residents built cottages and houses on their plots. Most cottages are in the Victorian style, although different styles are present throughout. Restaurants and shops also opened around the downtown park of Lakeside. The Lakeside Association eventually purchased additional land on the eastern side, enabling the community to grow. Recreation facilities, meeting halls, places of worship, and parks have been added over the years. The Lakeside Association is responsible for the upkeep of all roads and public services within Lakeside. Lakeside has had its own symphony orchestra since its founding in 1963 with its current conductor, Daniel Meyer.
One of its most famous activities is shuffleboard, with its courts hosting lots of national tournaments throughout its history.

Architecture 

Lakeside contains many well-preserved historic buildings. Many of these buildings are in their original Victorian style, with variation throughout. In 2001 Chris Thomas documented all the homes and buildings within the gates of Lakeside, and counted a total of 890, although more have been built since then along the Oak Avenue extension and still others as in-fill projects. The community is largely residential with a small business/shopping area near Central Park. The Lakeside Association owns and operates a number of large assembly buildings:

 Hoover Auditorium (Third St. between Walnut and Central)
 South Auditorium (Sixth St. between Walnut and Central)
 Orchestra Hall (corner of Second and Walnut)
 Wesley Lodge (Fifth St. between Walnut and Central)

Places of worship:
 Bradley Temple (corner of Cedar and Third) The Bradley family constructed this facility and donated it to Lakeside on the condition that it be used for children's worship activities.
 Lakeside United Methodist Church (corner of Fifth and Central)
 Chapel in the Woods (outdoor space along Maple past Seventh)
 Hoover Auditorium (Third St between Walnut and Central) Lakeside's main auditorium, with a seating capacity of 3,000 persons, is used for worship services on Sunday mornings and headline events during the week.

Restaurants: 
  Coffee and Cream 

There is also a small local museum, Heritage Hall, at the corner of Maple Avenue and Third Street. The Lakeside Archives, where property records and Lakeside Association minutes going back to the 1800s are available for inspection, is located at 210 Walnut.

The fountain at Lakeside Hotel was built by the late landscaper Robert L. Barna, and two of his sons Jimmy J. Barna (Landscape/Architect), and Steven C. Barna.

Lodging 
The Hotel Lakeside was built in 1874 and is open from Memorial Day to Labor Day. After Labor Day through October, it is open to private groups only. The Fountain Inn, on the other hand, is open all year. A more modern hotel, it has conference facilities as well. There are many privately owned cottages available for rental through local real estate offices, in addition to smaller bed and breakfast inns. Cabins and an RV campground are available for a more rustic atmosphere. Finally, group dormitory accommodations, usually for youth groups, are available at WoHoMis Lodge.

Famous people
Because lakeside has historically been a summer vacation destination with few year-round residents, the famous people listed here are persons who made at least one lakeside stop during their lifetime. One person who still spends many summers here is Steve Hartman. Famous people who have been to Lakeside & Hoover Auditorium are the likes of:
Susan B. Anthony 
William Jennings Bryan 
Amelia Earhart
Eleanor Roosevelt
Robert McFerrin
Marian Anderson
Pat Boone
Emmylou Harris
Abigail Harlor
Ulysses S. Grant
Rutherford B. Hayes 
William McKinley
Champ Clark
Drew Pearson
J.C. Penney
Lowell Thomas
Jane Addams

See also
 Lakeside and Marblehead Railroad
 Toledo, Port Clinton and Lakeside Railway
 Lakeside Association Police Department

References

External links

Official Lakeside web page

 
Census-designated places in Ottawa County, Ohio
Resorts in the United States
United Methodist Church
Populated places established in 1873
Chautauqua
Ohio populated places on Lake Erie
National Register of Historic Places in Ottawa County, Ohio
Historic districts on the National Register of Historic Places in Ohio